Gowzgavand (also Romanized as Gowzgavand) is a village in Rowzeh Chay Rural District, in the Central District of Urmia County, West Azerbaijan Province, Iran. At the 2006 census, its population was 122, in 40 families.

References 

Populated places in Urmia County